Chmielowice  (German Chmiellowitz) is a part of city of Opole (before 2017 a village in the administrative district of Gmina Komprachcice, within Opole County, Opole Voivodeship, in south-western Poland).

The village has an approximate population of 1,500.

References

Chmielowice